"Miss You" is a song by Norwegian DJ and producer Martin Tungevaag, Dutch DJ duo Sick Individuals and producer Marf, it was released on 13 November 2020, via Spinnin' Records.

Background and content
Dance music artist Marf accepted an interview with EDM Unplugged, and explained the inspiration behind the song: 

Natalie Wicks wrote in the article that "Miss You" is "a sun-kissed upbeat release that is perfect for the changing of the seasons. With an enrapturing melody and a catchy hook" and "embraced by the world". The song is written in the key of A major, with a tempo of 125 beats per minute.

Credits and personnel
Credits adapted from AllMusic.

 Marcus Adema – composer
 Jochen Fluitsma – composer
 Rinze Hofstee – composer
 Marf – primary artist, producer, programmer
 Sick Individuals – primary artist, producer, programmer
 Jim Smeele – composer
 Martin Tungevaag – composer, primary artist, producer, programmer
 Eric VanTijn –  composer
 Flemming Viguurs – composer

Charts

Weekly charts

Year-end charts

References

2020 songs
2020 singles
Martin Tungevaag songs
Spinnin' Records singles